This page details the career achievements of Basketball Hall of Famer Magic Johnson. He is a member of NBA's 50th Anniversary All-Time Team and is widely considered to be the greatest point guard of all-time.

Career highlights

One of several players in NBA history to average at least 22.5 points, 12 assists and 6 rebounds for a season
He accomplished the feat twice, in 1987 and 1989
One of four players in NBA history to win NCAA and NBA championships in consecutive years.
Includes Bill Russell, Henry Bibby, and Billy Thompson
One of six players in NBA history to record a triple-double in an NBA Finals clinching game  (1982 and 1985).
Includes Larry Bird (1986), James Worthy (1988), Tim Duncan (2003), LeBron James (2012 and 2016), and Draymond Green (2015)
One of four players in NBA history to record a triple-double in their playoff debut.
Includes Johnny McCarthy, LeBron James and Nikola Jokic
One of two players in NBA history to set 20+ assists in at least 30 games: achieved it 32 times
Includes John Stockton, who achieved it 38 times
Only player in NBA history to win the NBA Finals Most Valuable Player Award in his rookie season

Regular season

3× NBA Most Valuable Player (1987, 1989, 1990)
4× NBA assists leader (1983, 1984, 1986, 1987)
2× NBA steals leader (1981, 1982)
1× NBA free-throw percentage leader (1989)
9× All-NBA First Team (1983 to 91)
1× All-NBA Second Team (1982)
All-Rookie first team (1980)

NBA All-Star Game

2× NBA All-Star Game MVP (1990, 1992)
12× NBA All-Star (1980, 1982–1992)

NBA Playoffs

5x NBA Playoffs assists leader (1980, 1984–87)
9x NBA Playoffs total assists leader (1980, 1983–89, 1991)
2x NBA Playoffs steals leader (1980, 1982)
2x NBA Playoffs total steals leader (1980, 1983)
1x NBA Playoffs minutes played leader (1983)
3x NBA Playoffs total minutes played leader (1983, 1988, 1991)
Led the 1991 NBA Playoffs in total minutes played, three points made, free throws made, defensive rebounds and assists

NBA Finals

3x NBA Finals MVP (1980, 1982, 1987)
5x NBA Champion (1980, 1982, 1985, 1987–88)
4x NBA runner-up (1983, 1984, 1989, 1991)
8x NBA Finals assists leader (1980, 1983–85, 1987–89, 1991)

Los Angeles Lakers

Los Angeles Lakers #32 retired
Selected as the first overall pick in the 1979 NBA Draft

NBA records

Career
Holds the all-time record for highest career assists-per-game average—11.2
Holds the all-time record for most assists in Playoffs—2,346 
 Johnson is also the only player in NBA history to have at least 2,000 assists in a playoff career
Holds the all-time record for highest assists-per-game average in Playoffs—12.4
Holds the all-time record for most triple-doubles in Playoffs—30

All-Star Game
Holds the all-time record for most assists in a game w/o OT—19 (1988)
Holds the all-time record for most assists in a half—13 (1984)

Playoffs
Holds single-series playoff record for highest assists-per-game average—15.2 (1985)
Shares single-game playoff record for most assists made in a game—24 (May 15, 1984, vs. Phoenix Suns)
Shares single-game playoff record for most assists made in a half—15 (May 3, 1985, vs. Portland)
Shares single-game playoff record for most free throws made in one half—19 (May 8, 1991, vs. Golden State)

Finals
Holds the single-series record for highest assists-per-game average—14.0 (1985)
Shares the single-series record for most triple-doubles—2 (1985)
Holds the record for most points by a rookie, game—42 (May 16, 1980, vs. Philadelphia)
Holds the record for most assists by a rookie, game—11 (May 7, 1980, vs. Philadelphia)
Holds the record for most assists made in a game—21 (June 3, 1984, vs. Boston Celtics)
Holds the record for most assists in one half—14 (June 19, 1988, vs. Detroit)
Holds the record for most assists in one quarter—8 (four times)

Los Angeles Lakers
Most assists, total: 10,141
Highest assists-per-game average, career: 11.2
Highest assists-per-game average in a season: 13.1
Most assists in a season: 989
Most assists in a game: 24
Most steals in a season: 208
Highest steals-per-game average in a season: 3.43
Most triple-doubles: 138
Highest free-throw percentage in a season: .911
3rd most playoff games played: 190
2nd most playoff minutes played: 7,538
4th most playoff points scored: 3,701
3rd most playoff free throws made: 1,068
5th most playoff field goals attempted: 2,522
5th most playoff rebounds grabbed: 1,465
3rd most playoff offensive rebounds: 349
Most playoff defensive rebounds: 1,116
Most playoff assists: 2,346
Most playoff steals: 359

Others

Game-winning shots

40-point games

USA Basketball
 A member of The Dream Team, which is considered to be the best Basketball team  ever assembled
 1992 Olympic Gold Medalist

College basketball achievements
Member of NCAA championship team (1979) 
NCAA Division I Tournament Most Outstanding Player (1979)
The Sporting News All-America first team (1979)

Other achievements
J. Walter Kennedy Citizenship Award (1992)
Grammy Award for Best Spoken Album (What You Can Do to Avoid AIDS) (1993)

References 

Magic Johnson
Los Angeles Lakers
Johnson, Magic